Draper is a surname, taken from the occupation (a draper was a merchant in cloth or dry goods). It is the 1365th most common name in the USA, with approximately 22,383.

People
Notable people with the surname include:

 Albert Draper (1897–1963), Canadian politician
 Brian Draper (born 1990), perpetrator, murder of Cassie Jo Stoddart
 Charles Draper (musician) (1869–1952), British clarinetist
 Charles Stark Draper (1901–1987), American engineer, after whom the Charles Stark Draper Laboratory, formerly part of MIT, is named
 Christopher Draper (1892–1979), British flying ace, secret agent, and film star
 Daniel Draper (1940–2004), American attorney and member of the Oklahoma House of Representatives
 Dave Draper (1942–2021), American bodybuilder
 Derek Draper (born 1967), British political lobbyist, spin doctor, editor of LabourList website, journalist, psychotherapist
 Dexter W. Draper (1881–1961), American college basketball and football coach
 Dontaye Draper (born 1984), American basketball player
 Dorothy Draper (1889–1969), American interior decorator
 Eben Sumner Draper (1858–1914), American politician, governor of Massachusetts
 Foy Draper (1911–1943), American athlete
 Francis Collier Draper (1837–1894), Chief Constable of Toronto
 Fred W. Draper (1868–1962), American politician
 Hal Draper (1914–1990), American socialist author
 Henry Draper (1837–1882), American doctor, pioneer of astrophotography, brother of John Christopher Draper and son of John William Draper
 Herbert James Draper (1863–1920), English painter
Jack Draper (1892–1962), American cinematographer
Jack Draper (tennis) (born 2001), British tennis player
 James Draper (disambiguation), multiple people, including
 James T. Draper Jr. (born 1935), former Southern Baptist Convention President
 James Draper (settler) (1618–1697), settler of the Massachusetts Bay Colony
 Jim Draper (James W. Draper, 1925–2006), Scottish golfer
 James Draper (umpire) (1925–2013), South African cricket umpire
 John Draper (disambiguation), several people, including
 John Draper "Captain Crunch" (born 1943), American hacker and telecommunications phreaker
 John Christopher Draper (1835–1885), American chemist, son of John William Draper and brother of Henry Draper
 John William Draper (1811−1882), English-born American scientist, historian and photographer
 John Draper (MP for New Shoreham), MP for New Shoreham (UK Parliament constituency) 1413–1416
 John Draper (MP for Rochester), MP for Rochester (UK Parliament constituency) in 1420
 John Draper (motorcyclist) (1939-2002), English professional motorcycle racer
 Kris Draper (born 1971), Canadian ice hockey player
 Margaret Green Draper (1727–c. 1804), American printer during the American Revolutionary War
 Mary Draper (1719–1810), participant in the American Revolutionary War
 Nicholas Draper (retired 2020), British historian, inaugural director of the Centre for the Study of the Legacies of British Slavery at University College London
 Nicholas Draper, British Labour Party candidate in several local elections since 1990, most recently the 1990 Merton London Borough Council election
 Nick Draper, Scots football player in the 2013–14 Inverness Caledonian Thistle F.C. season
 Paul Draper (disambiguation), several people, including
 Paul W. Draper (born 1978), American magician
 Paul Draper (bassoonist) (fl. 1933), with London Baroque Ensemble under Karl Haas (conductor)
 Paul Draper (cricketer) (born 1972), English cricketer
 Paul Draper (dancer) (1909–1996), American dancer
 Paul Draper (musician) (born 1970), English singer-songwriter
 Paul Draper (philosopher) (born 1957), American philosopher
 Paul Draper (priest) (born 1964), Church of Ireland Dean of Lismore
 Paul Draper (winemaker) (born 1936), American winemaker
 Peter Draper (born 1958), Australian politician
 Polly Draper (born 1955), American actress, writer, producer, and director
 Ray Draper (1940–1982), American jazz musician
 Robert Draper (born 1959), American author
 Ronald Draper (born 1926), South African cricketer
 Ross Draper (born 1988), English footballer
 Ruth Draper (1884–1956), American actress
 Scott Draper (born 1974), Australian tennis player and golfer
 Theodore Draper (1912–2006), American historian and political writer
 Timothy C. Draper (born 1958), American venture capitalist
 Thomas Draper (disambiguation): several people, including
 Thomas Draper (criminal) (1839–1883), American professional criminal
 Thomas Draper (died 1703), of the Draper baronets
 Thomas Draper, a name used by Thomas Fermore (died 1609), English MP
 Thomas Percy Draper (1864–1946), Australian politician and judge
 Tom Draper (born 1966), Canadian ice hockey player
 Trish Draper (born 1959), Australian politician
 Warren Fales Draper (1883–1970), U.S. Deputy Surgeon General and member of Eisenhower's staff during WWII
 Warren Fales Draper (publisher) (1818–1905), publisher in Andover, Massachusetts, philanthropist
 Wickliffe Draper (1891–1972), American segregationist, eugenicist and philanthropist; founded the Pioneer Fund
 William Draper (disambiguation): several people, including
 William Franklin Draper (artist) (1912–2003), American painter
 William Franklin Draper (politician) (1842–1910)
 William Henry Draper (1801–1877), Canadian judge and politician
 William Henry Draper (congressman) (1841–1921), American politician
 William Henry Draper Jr. (1894–1974), American general and venture capitalist, father of William Henry Draper III, grandfather of Timothy C. Draper and Polly Draper
 William Henry Draper III (born 1928), American venture capitalist, son of William Henry Draper Jr., father of Timothy C. Draper and Polly Draper.

Fictional characters with the surname
In Mad Men:
Anna Draper, Lt. Donald Draper's wife
Betty Draper, Don Draper's first wife
Bobby Draper, Don Draper's elder son
Don Draper, the protagonist of Mad Men
Gene Draper, Don Draper's younger son
Megan Draper, Don Draper's second wife
Sally Draper, Don Draper's daughter

English-language surnames
Occupational surnames
French-language surnames
Surnames of French origin
English-language occupational surnames

ja:ドレイパー